Schlag bei Thalberg is a former municipality in the district of Hartberg-Fürstenfeld in Styria, Austria. At the 2015 Styria municipal structural reform, it was divided between the municipalities Dechantskirchen and Rohrbach an der Lafnitz.

References

Cities and towns in Hartberg-Fürstenfeld District